Villoonni is a village  from Kottayam, Kerala, India. Its main buildings include St. Xavier's Church, the Village office, and St. Philomina LP and HS schools.

References

Villages in Kottayam district